Program of Introducing Talents of Discipline to Universities, Plan 111, also be referred to as Project 111 or 111 Project is a project initiated in 2006 by the Ministry of Education of the People's Republic of China (MOE) and State Administration of Foreign Experts Affairs (SAFEA) to establish innovation centers for the purposes of technology transfer. In 2005, the MOE announced the creation of 100 innovation centers as part of the plan. The plan aimed to bring in about 1,000 overseas experts from the top 100 universities and research institutes worldwide.

Plan 111 became an avenue for foreign technology transfer of both civilian and military application. The plan established centers at universities that support defense-related research and development such as Harbin Engineering University, Beijing Institute of Technology, Beihang University, Northwestern Polytechnical University, Nanjing University of Aeronautics and Astronautics, and Xidian University.

See also

 Thousand Talents Program (China)
State Key Laboratory
 Double First Class University Plan
 Project 985
 863 Program
 Science and technology in China

References

External links
 Chinese Talent Program Tracker at the Center for Security and Emerging Technology

 
Higher education in China
Technology transfer
China Projects